Arnie Bernstein (born 1960) is an American writer of historical nonfiction.  His works include Bath Massacre: America’s First School Bombing and Swastika Nation: Fritz Kuhn and the Rise and Fall of the German-American Bund.

Biography 
Bernstein is a Chicago native. He graduated from Niles West High School and attended Southern Illinois University as an undergraduate where he majored in film studies and theater. He received his master's degree from Columbia College Chicago.

His writings have covered topics such as the Bath School bombing and the German-American Bund and its leader, Fritz Kuhn. His writing has been featured in Tablet magazine. He has also been published in the Chicago Tribune.

Bernstein has discussed his book Bath Massacre on C-SPAN Book TV  and on the Australian Radio National show RN Breakfast. He discussed his book Swastika Nation  in an interview with the Polish journal Historia Do Rzeczy, on MSNBC on the AM Joy Show, and on the podcast Your Weekly Constitutional with Stewart Harris.

Bernstein's book Swastika Nation was reviewed in The New York Times  and the Kirkus Reviews. 
His elaboration of the adversarial relationship between Fritz Kuhn and iconic American columnist Walter Winchell was also subsequently published in the Times Book Review.

Awards and honors
 2000 American Regional History Book Award for Hollywood on Lake Michigan: 100 Years of Chicago and the Movies, First Place
 2005 Illinois State Library Authors Fair
 2010 Michigan Notable Book Honors for Bath Massacre: America's First School Bombing
 He earned the Warner Brothers Studios Comedy Writing Workshop scholarship
 He received the Puffin Foundation grant
 Lit 50: Who Really Books Chicago 2019. Named as one of the top 50 people in the Chicago book world, along with Alta Price, for advocacy work in Chicago on behalf of the Authors Guild

Works

References

External links
 Presentation by Arnie Bernstein, author of the new book, Hoofs and guns of the storm : Chicago's Civil War connection.
 Arnie Bernstein's website
 Arnie Bernstein's profile - Illinois Center for the Book
 Local author spotlight interview with Arnie Bernstein from the Chicago Book Review  
 Kirkus Review of Swastika Nation 

1960 births
Living people
Writers from Chicago
American military historians
21st-century American historians
21st-century American male writers
Historians from Illinois
American male non-fiction writers